Pardesi ('Journey Beyond Three Seas') is a 1957 film jointly directed by Khwaja Ahmad Abbas and Vasili Pronin. It was made in two versions, Hindi and Russian, and is based on the travelogues of Russian traveller Afanasy Nikitin, called A Journey Beyond the Three Seas, which is now considered a Russian literary monument.

Made during the high time of Indo-Russian amity, Pardesi is an Indo-Soviet co-production between the state-owned "Mosfilm Studio" and Khwaja Ahmad Abbas's, "Naya Sansar International" production house.

The film has music by Anil Biswas, and it had some memorable hits such as Rasiya Re Man Basiya Re, by Meena Kapoor, Na Dir Dim, by Lata Mangeshkar and was danced to by Padmini. The film was in SovColor, though no colour print of the Hindi version is known to survive in India. Only a black and white copy of the Hindi film survives.

Synopsis
The film tells the story of Afanasy Nikitin (Oleg Strizhenov), a 15th-century, Russian trader who travelled to India (1466–1472) and falls in love with an Indian girl, Champa (Nargis).

Cast

 Oleg Strizhenov as Afanasy Nikitin
 Nargis as Champa
 Padmini as Laxmi
 Prithviraj Kapoor as Mahmood Gawan
 Balraj Sahni as Sakharam
 David as Asad Khan
 Achala Sachdev as Champa's Mother
 Manmohan Krishna as Champa's Father
 Paidi Jairaj as Hassan Beg Khurasani
 Rashid Khan as Scribe
 Stepan Kayukov as Yevsey Ivanovich

Music
 "Rasiyaa Re Man Basiyaa Re" – Meena Kapoor
 "Na Dir Dhin Tana Dere Na, Na Ja Na Ja Balam" – Lata Mangeshkar
 "Phir Milenge Jane Wale Yar Dusvidaniya" – Manna Dey
 "So Ja Re Lalna So Ja Re Lalna" – Meena Kapoor
 "Rim Jhim Rim Jhim Barse Pani Re" – Meena Kapoor, Manna Dey
 "Jai Jai Ramkrishna Hari, Tujh Me Ram Mujh Me Ram" – Manna Dey
 "Arre Zara Suno Lagakar Dhyan" (2) – Manna Dey
 "Arre Zara Suno Lagakar Dhyan, Yaha Jan Me Log Mahan" – Manna Dey

Awards
 1958 Cannes Film Festival – Golden Palm – Nomination
 1958 Filmfare Best Art Direction Award – M.R. Acharekar

References

External links
 
 
 Pardesi remembered 50 years on
 Rasiya Re Man Basiya Re (Meena Kapoor)-Pardesi Song

1957 films
1950s historical drama films
Films set in the 1460s
Films set in the 1470s
1950s Hindi-language films
Indian multilingual films
Soviet multilingual films
Indian historical drama films
Soviet historical drama films
1950s Russian-language films
Films directed by K. A. Abbas
Films scored by Anil Biswas
Films with screenplays by Khwaja Ahmad Abbas
1950s multilingual films